Mike Sirianni (born March 22, 1972) is an American football coach and former player.  He is currently the  head football coach for Washington & Jefferson College in Washington, Pennsylvania, a position he has held since the 2003 season after succeeding Pittsburgh Steelers great John Banaszak.  Sirianni has compiled a record of 101–24 in 11 seasons as head coach.  Sirianni's winning percentage of .846 is second best among active head coaches with at least five years of experience in NCAA football, trailing only that of Mount Union coach Larry Kehres, for whom he played.  In his first 11 years of coaching at Washington & Jefferson, he won PAC Coach of the Year five times.

Sirianni attended Mount Union College, where he was a wide receiver on the school's first NCAA Division III Football Championship-winning team in 1993.  He worked as an assistant coach for Mount Union in 1996 and 1997 on teams that won two more NCAA Division III national titles.

Mike is the brother of Philadelphia Eagles head coach Nick Sirianni.

Head coaching record

References

External links
 Washington & Jefferson profile

1972 births
Living people
American football wide receivers
Mount Union Purple Raiders football coaches
Mount Union Purple Raiders football players
Washington & Jefferson Presidents football coaches
Wilkes Colonels football coaches
College men's track and field athletes in the United States